A cargo aircraft (also known as freight aircraft, freighter, airlifter or cargo jet) is a fixed-wing aircraft that is designed or converted for the carriage of cargo rather than passengers. Such aircraft usually do not incorporate passenger amenities and generally feature one or more large doors for loading cargo. Freighters may be operated by civil passenger or cargo airlines, by private individuals or by the armed forces of individual countries.

Aircraft designed for cargo flight usually have features that distinguish them from conventional passenger aircraft: a wide/tall fuselage cross-section, a high-wing to allow the cargo area to sit near the ground, numerous wheels to allow it to land at unprepared locations, and a high-mounted tail to allow cargo to be driven directly into and off the aircraft.

By 2015, dedicated freighters represent 43% of the 700 billion ATK (available tonne-kilometer) capacity, while 57% is carried in airliner's cargo holds. Also in 2015, Boeing forecast belly freight to rise to 63% while specialised cargoes would represent 37% of a 1,200 billion ATKs in 2035.
The Cargo Facts Consulting firm forecasts that the global freighter fleet will rise from 1,782 to 2,920 cargo aircraft from 2019 to 2039.

History

Aircraft were put to use carrying cargo in the form of air mail as early as 1911. Although the earliest aircraft were not designed primarily as cargo carriers, by the mid-1920s aircraft manufacturers were designing and building dedicated cargo aircraft.

In the UK during the early 1920s, the need was recognized for a freighter aircraft to transport troops and material quickly to pacify tribal revolts in the newly occupied territories of the Middle East. The Vickers Vernon, a development of the Vickers Vimy Commercial, entered service with the Royal Air Force as the first dedicated troop transport in 1921. In February 1923 this was put to use by the RAF's Iraq Command who flew nearly 500 Sikh troops from Kingarban to Kirkuk in the first ever strategic airlift of troops. Vickers Victorias played an important part in the Kabul Airlift of November 1928 – February 1929, when they evacuated diplomatic staff and their dependents together with members of the Afghan royal family endangered by a civil war. The Victorias also helped to pioneer air routes for Imperial Airways' Handley Page HP.42 airliners.

The World War II German design, the Arado Ar 232 was the first purpose-built cargo aircraft. The Ar 232 was intended to supplant the earlier Junkers Ju 52 freighter conversions, but only a few were built. Most other forces used freighter versions of airliners in the cargo role as well, most notably the C-47 Skytrain version of the Douglas DC-3, which served with practically every Allied nation. One important innovation for future cargo aircraft design was introduced in 1939, with the fifth and sixth prototypes of the Junkers Ju 90 four-engined military transport aircraft, with the earliest known example of a rear loading ramp. This aircraft, like most of its era, used tail-dragger landing gear which caused the aircraft to have a decided rearward tilt when landed. These aircraft introduced the Trapoklappe, a powerful ramp/hydraulic lift with a personnel stairway centered between the vehicle trackway ramps, that raised the rear of the aircraft into the air and allowed easy loading. A similar rear loading ramp even appeared in a somewhat different form on the nosewheel gear-equipped, late WW II era American Budd RB-1 Conestoga twin-engined cargo aircraft.

Postwar Europe also served to play a major role in the development of the modern air cargo and air freight industry. It is during the Berlin Airlift at the height of the Cold War, when a massive mobilization of aircraft was undertaken by the West to supply West Berlin with food and supplies, in a virtual around the clock air bridge, after the Soviet Union closed and blockaded Berlin's land links to the west. To rapidly supply the needed numbers of aircraft, many older types, especially the Douglas C-47 Skytrain, were pressed into service. In operation it was found that it took as long or longer to unload these older designs as the much larger tricycle landing gear Douglas C-54 Skymaster which was easier to move about in when landed. The C-47s were quickly removed from service, and from then on flat-decks were a requirement of all new cargo designs.

In the years following the war era a number of new custom-built cargo aircraft were introduced, often including some "experimental" features. For instance, the US's C-82 Packet featured a removable cargo area, while the C-123 Provider introduced the now-common rear fuselage/upswept tail shaping to allow for a much larger rear loading ramp. But it was the introduction of the turboprop that allowed the class to mature, and even one of its earliest examples, the C-130 Hercules, in the 21st century as the Lockheed Martin C-130J, is still the yardstick against which newer military transport aircraft designs are measured. Although larger, smaller and faster designs have been proposed for many years, the C-130 continues to improve at a rate that keeps it in production.

"Strategic" cargo aircraft became an important class of their own starting with the Lockheed C-5 Galaxy in the 1960s and a number of similar Soviet designs from the 70s and 80s, and culminating in the Antonov An-225, the world's largest aircraft. These designs offer the ability to carry the heaviest loads, even main battle tanks, at global ranges. The Boeing 747 was originally designed to the same specification as the C-5, but later modified as a design that could be offered as either passenger or all-freight versions. The "bump" on the top of the fuselage allows the crew area to be clear of the cargo containers sliding out of the front in the event of an accident.

When the Airbus A380 was announced, the maker originally accepted orders for the freighter version A380F, offering the second largest payload capacity of any cargo aircraft, exceeded only by the An-225. An aerospace consultant has estimated that the A380F would have 7% better payload and better range than the 747-8F, but also higher trip costs. 
Starting May 2020 Portuguese Hi Fly started charting cargo flights with an A380, carrying medical supplies from China to different parts of the world in the response to the Covid-19 outbreak. It allows almost  of cargo between the three decks. In November 2020 Emirates started offering an A380 mini-freighter, which allows for 50 tons of cargo in the belly of the plane.

Cargo aircraft types
Nearly all commercial cargo aircraft presently in the fleet are derivatives or transformations of passenger aircraft. However, there are three other methods to the development of cargo aircraft.

Derivatives of non-cargo aircraft

Many types can be converted from airliner to freighter by installing a main deck cargo door with its control systems; upgrading floor beams for cargo loads and replacing passenger equipment and furnishings with new linings, ceilings, lighting, floors, drains and smoke detectors.
Specialized engineering teams rival Airbus and Boeing, giving the aircraft another 15–20 years of life.
Aeronautical Engineers Inc. converts the Boeing 737-300/400/800, MD-80 and Bombardier CRJ200.
Israel Aerospace Industries’ Bedek Aviation converts the 737-300/400/700/800 in about 90 days, 767-200/300s in about four months and 747-400s in five months, and is looking at the Boeing 777, Airbus A330 and A321. Voyageur Aviation Corp located in North Bay, Ontario converts the DHC-8-100 into the DHC-8-100 Package Freighter Conversion.

An A300B4-200F conversion cost $5M in 1996, an A300-600F $8M in 2001, an MD-11F $9M in 1994, a B767-300ERF $13M in 2007, a B747-400 PSF $22M in 2006, an A330-300 P2F was estimated at $20M in 2016 and a B777-200ER BCF at $40M in 2017.
By avoiding the main deck door installation and relying on lighter elevators between decks, LCF Conversions wants to convert A330/A340s or B777s for $6.5M to $7.5M.
In the mid 2000s, passenger 747-400s cost $30–50 million before a $25 million conversion, a B757 had to cost $15 million before conversion, falling to below $10 million by 2018, and $5 million for a 737 Classic, falling to $2–3 million for a B737-400 by 2018.

Derivative freighters have most of their development costs already amortized, and lead time before production is shorter than all new aircraft. Converted cargo aircraft use older technology; their direct operating costs are higher than what might be achieved with current technology. Since they have not been designed specifically for air cargo, loading and unloading is not optimized; the aircraft may be pressurized more than necessary, and there may be unnecessary apparatus for passenger safety.

Dedicated civilian cargo aircraft
A dedicated commercial air freighter is an airplane which has been designed from the beginning as a freighter, with no restrictions caused by either passenger or military requirements. Over the years, there has been a dispute concerning the cost effectiveness of such an airplane, with some cargo carriers stating that they could consistently earn a profit if they had such an aircraft. To help resolve this disagreement, the National Aeronautics and Space Administration (NASA) selected two contractors, Douglas Aircraft Co. and Lockheed-Georgia Co., to independently evaluate the possibility of producing such a freighter by 1990. This was done as part of the Cargo/Logistics Airlift Systems Study (CLASS). At comparable payloads, dedicated cargo aircraft was said to provide a 20 percent reduction in trip cost and a 15 percent decrease in aircraft price compared to other cargo aircraft. These findings, however, are extremely sensitive to assumptions about fuel and labor costs and, most particularly, to growth in demand for air cargo services. Further, it ignores the competitive situation brought about by the lower capital costs of future derivative air cargo aircraft.

The main advantage of the dedicated air freighter is that it can be designed specifically for air freight demand, providing the type of loading and unloading, flooring, fuselage configuration, and pressurization which are optimized for its mission. Moreover, it can make full use of NASA's ACEE results, with the potential of significantly lowering operating costs and fuel usage. Such a high overhead raises the price of the airplane and its direct operating cost (because of depreciation and insurance costs) and increases the financial risks to investors, especially since it would be competing with derivatives which have much smaller development costs per unit and which themselves have incorporated some of the cost-reducing technology.

Joint civil-military cargo aircraft
One benefit of a combined development is that the development costs would be shared by the civil and military sectors, and the number of airplanes required by the military could be decreased by the number of civil reserve airplanes purchased by air carriers and available to the military in case of emergency.
There are some possible drawbacks, as the restrictions executed by joint development, the punishments that would be suffered by both civil and military airplanes, and the difficulty in discovering an organizational structure that authorizes their compromise. Some features appropriate to a military aircraft would have to be rejected, because they are not suitable for a civil freighter. Moreover, each airplane would have to carry some weight which it would not carry if it were independently designed. This additional weight lessens the payload and the profitability of the commercial version. This could either be compensated by a transfer payment at acquisition, or an operating penalty compensation payment. Most important, it is not clear that there will be an adequate market for the civil version or that it will be cost competitive with derivatives of passenger aircraft.

Unpiloted cargo aircraft 

Rapid delivery demand and e-commerce growth stimulate UAV freighters development for 2020:
 Californian Elroy Air wants to replace trucks on inefficient routes and should fly a subscale prototype;
 Californian Natilus plans a Boeing 747 sized transpacific unpiloted freighter and should fly a subscale prototype;
 Californian Sabrewing Aircraft targets small regional unpiloted freighter and should fly a 65%-scale vehicle in 2018 fall;
 The Chinese Academy of Sciences flew its  payload AT200 in October 2017 based on New Zealand's PAC P-750 XSTOL utility turboprop
 Chinese package carrier SF Express conducted emergency logistics tests in December 2017 with a Tengoen Technologies’ TB001 medium-altitude UAV, and plan an eight-turbofan carrying  more than 
 Boeing flew its Boeing Cargo Air Vehicle prototype, a vertical takeoff and landing (eVTOL) craft.

Carpinteria, California-startup Dorsal Aircraft wants to make light standard ISO containers part of its unpiloted freighter structure where the wing, engines and tail are attached to a dorsal spine fuselage.
Wagner Aeronautical of San Diego, experienced in passenger-to-cargo conversions.

Garuda Indonesia will test three of them initially from September 2019, before operations in the fourth quarter.
Garuda plans up to 100 cargo UAVs to connect remote regions with limited airports in Maluku, Papua, and Sulawesi.

Examples

Early air mail and airlift logistics aircraft

 Avro Lancastrian (Transatlantic mail)
 Avro York (Berlin Airlift)
 Boeing C-7000
 Curtiss JN-4
 Douglas M-2
 Douglas DC-3
 Douglas DC-4
 Douglas DC-6

Converted airliners

Oversize transport

Light aircraft

Military cargo aircraft

Experimental cargo aircraft

 Hughes H-4 Hercules ("Spruce Goose")
 Lockheed R6V Constitution
 LTV XC-142

Comparisons

See also

 Airlift
 Air transport
 Cargo airline
 Modular aircraft
 Preighter

References

External links

 Airlift Cargo Aircraft
 History of the Airmail Service
 Indo-Russian Transport Aircraft (IRTA)

 
Military transport aircraft